Isabella d'Este (19 May 1474 – 13 February 1539) was Marchioness of Mantua and one of the leading women of the Italian Renaissance as a major cultural and political figure. She was a patron of the arts as well as a leader of fashion, whose innovative style of dressing was copied by numerous women. The poet Ariosto labeled her as the "liberal and magnanimous Isabella", while author Matteo Bandello described her as having been "supreme among women". Diplomat Niccolò da Correggio went even further by hailing her as "The First Lady of the world".

She served as the regent of Mantua during the absence of her husband Francesco II Gonzaga and during the minority of her son Federico. She was a prolific letter-writer and maintained a lifelong correspondence with her sister-in-law Elisabetta Gonzaga. Isabella grew up in a cultured family in the city-state of Ferrara. She received a fine classical education and as a girl met many famous humanist scholars and artists. Due to the vast amount of extant correspondence between Isabella and her family and friends, her life is extremely well documented.

Early life 
Isabella was born on Tuesday, 19 May 1474 at nine o'clock in the evening  Isabella's mother wrote a letter to her friend Barbara Gonzaga describing the details of Isabella's birth in Ferrara, to Ercole I d'Este, Duke of Ferrara, and Eleanor of Naples. Eleanor was the daughter of Ferdinand I, the Aragonese King of Naples, and Isabella of Clermont. 

One year later on 29 June 1475, her sister Beatrice was born, and in 1476 and 1477 two brothers, Alfonso and Ferrante, were born. In 1479 and 1480 two more brothers were born; Ippolito and Sigismondo. Of all the children born into the family, Isabella was considered to have been the favourite.

In the year of her brother Ferrante's birth, Isabella was among the children of the family who travelled to Naples with her mother. When her mother returned to Ferrara, Isabella accompanied her, while the other two children remained in Naples for many years: Beatrice was adopted by her grandfather, and her little brother Ferrante left under the tutelage of their uncle Alfonso.

Education 
Because of her outstanding intellect, she often discussed the classics and the affairs of state with ambassadors. Moreover, she was personally acquainted with the painters, musicians, writers, and scholars who lived in and around the court. Besides her knowledge of history and languages, she could also recite Virgil and Terence by heart. Isabella was also a talented singer and musician, and was taught to play the lute by Giovanni Angelo Testagrossa. In addition to all these admirable accomplishments, she was also an innovator of new dances, having been instructed in the art by Ambrogio, a Jewish dancing master.

Betrothal and marriage 

In 1480, at the age of six, Isabella was betrothed to the eight years older Francesco, the heir to the Marquess of Mantua. The Duke of Milan had requested her hand in marriage for his son, Ludovico, two weeks later. Instead, her sister, Beatrice was betrothed to Ludovico and became the Duchess of Milan. Her dowry amounted to 25,000 ducats. Although he was not handsome, Isabella admired Francesco for his strength and bravery; she also regarded him as a gentleman. After their first few encounters she found that she enjoyed his company and she spent the next few years getting to know him and preparing to be the Marchioness of Mantua. During their courtship, Isabella treasured the letters, poems, and sonnets he sent her as gifts.

Ten years later on 11 February 1490, at age 15, she married Francesco by proxy. By then, he had succeeded to the marquisate. Besides being the Marquess, Francesco was captain general of the armies of the Republic of Venice. Isabella became his wife and marchioness amid a spectacular outpouring of popular acclamation and a grand celebration that took place on 15 February. She brought as her marriage portion the sum of 3,000 ducats as well as valuable jewellery, dishes, and a silver service.  Prior to the magnificent banquet which followed the wedding ceremony, Isabella rode through the main streets of Ferrara astride a horse draped in gems and gold.

Relations with Milan 
In 1491 Isabella went with a small entourage to Brescello and from there to Pavia, to accompany her sister Beatrice who was married to Ludovico il Moro. On this occasion she saw again – since she had already known him as a child in Ferrara – Galeazzo Sanseverino, with whom she undertook a dense, and at times humorous, exchange of letters. It must be said, however, that the identity of the sender is not certain and could be the almost homonymous Galeazzo Visconti, Count of Busto Arsizio, a courtier also dear to the dukes. 

Between the two immediately ignited a dispute, destined to last for months, on who was the best paladin, Orlando or Rinaldo: Galeazzo supported the first, the sisters d'Este the second. Galeazzo, who exercised a strong fascination, soon managed to convert them both to Orlando's faith, but Isabella, once back in Mantua, returned to prefer Rinaldo, so that Galeazzo remembered her as "I alone was enough to make her change her mind and cry out Rolando! Rolando!", invited her to follow her sister's example and swore that he would convert her a second time, as soon as they met again. Isabella jokingly replied that she would then bring a frog to offend him, and the dispute went on for a long time.

On February 11, speaking to her about the amusements he had with Beatrice, he wrote to her: "I will also strive to improve in order to give greater pleasure to the S. V., when I come for her this summer", and lamented the lack of "his sweet company".  Isabella's presence was in fact much desired in Milan, not only by Galeazzo but also by her sister, Ludovico and the other courtiers, however the Marquise was able to go there a few times, as her husband Francesco was wary of sending it to her, judging that in that court too many "madness" were committed, and perhaps also out of jealousy of Ludovico. 

Despite the affection, Isabella began to feel envy for her sister Beatrice, first for the very fortunate marriage that had touched her and for the enormous riches, then for the two sons in perfect health who were born to her a short time later, while she seemed unable to have children, and in this aroused the concerns of her mother Eleonora, who continually exhorted her in letters to be as close as possible to her husband.  A certain hatred can also be seen in a letter to his mother dating back to his visit to Pavia in August 1492, when, speaking of Beatrice, he wrote: "she is not a greater than me, but she is much bigger!"; in a similar way she also expressed herself to her husband, not being able yet to know, perhaps, that the sister's coarseness was due to the incipient pregnancy (she was at the fourth-fifth month). These frictions were perhaps also linked to the fact that Ludovico had initially asked for Isabella's hand, in 1480, and that this had not been possible because, only a few days earlier, Duke Ercole had officially promised it to Francesco Gonzaga. 

Despite everything, in 1492 she was very close to Beatrice in a difficult moment of her pregnancy, that is when she was suddenly struck by an attack of malarial fevers, and in 1495 she went again to Milan to assist her sister in her second birth and also baptized her nephew Francesco. 

In the summer of 1494, on the occasion of the descent of the French into Italy, Beatrice invited her sister to Milan to kiss Gilbert of Montpensier and others of the royal house, according to the custom French. Secretary Benedetto Capilupi reported: In fact, it does not seem that Beatrice had any conflicting feelings towards Isabella, nor that she saw with a bad eye the complicity between the latter and her husband Ludovico. The Moro in fact, who was of generous nature, often gave Isabella even very expensive gifts: once he sent her fifteen arms of a fabric so precious as to cost forty ducats on her arm – an amazing sum – saying that he had already made a dress for Beatrice.  

After the death of his wife, which took place in 1497, Ludovico came to allude to a secret relationship with Isabella, claiming that it was out of jealousy of his wife that the Marquis Francesco played a double game between him and the Lordship of Venice. The rumor was however promptly denied by his father Ercole.

Others instead defined Beatrice's attitude towards her sister as "complexed second child" because in the letter of congratulations to Isabella for the birth of little Eleonora - who, being female, incredibly disappointed her mother - she added the greetings of her little son Hercules to "soa cusina", despite not having the child yet turned one year of age, something that historians such as Luciano Chiappini interpreted as a sort of mockery, of "refined malice", "a slap given with grace and grace". In fact, if Isabella was always the daughter most loved by her parents, Beatrice had been ceded to her grandfather, and only with the birth of the firstborn had she obtained her own revenge.

Other mischief between sisters dates back to the weeks immediately following the battle of Fornovo: Beatrice, who was at the siege of Novara together with the Marquis Francesco, wanted to see the booty stolen from the tent of King Charles VIII during the battle, booty that however Francesco had already sent to his wife in Mantua. He wrote to his wife to give it to his sister-in-law, but Isabella replied that she was not so willing to cede this honor to her sister and, with the excuse that she lacked a mule, begged her husband to invent some expedient. Beatrice replied that it was not her intention to steal the booty from her sister, but that she only wanted to see it all together and then return it to her. Meanwhile, it occurred to her to procure "a femina de partito", that is, a high-ranking prostitute, to Francis, saying to do it "for a good cause and to avoid greater evil", that is to say to preserve her brother-in-law and sister from the terrible malfrancese, but perhaps also to ingratiate herself with him. In October Francis wrote to his wife sorry that she was not there with them to see the army before it was disbanded, but it does not seem that he had urged her to come, probably because he had at heart his safety (the camps were dangerous places, where violent fights often broke out, and Beatrice herself had been saved on one occasion by Francis, when she risked being raped by a few thousand Alemannic mercenaries).

Moreover, Isabella had already had a mishap with some Genoese soldiers who, upon entering the city in 1492, surrounded her to appropriate her mount and harness, according to custom. So she later told her husband: "I was never more afraid; and they tore all the harness to pieces, and took off the bridle before I could dismount, despite the fact that the governor interposed him and that I voluntarily offered it to him. I lost heart, although among so many partisans I was afraid of some misfortune. Finally, helped, I freed myself from their hands ".

Having also received different educations, the two sisters were the opposite of each other: Isabella, more like her mother, was sweet, graceful and a lover of tranquility; Beatrice, more like her father, was impetuous, adventurous and aggressive. Beatrice loved to shoot crossbow, Isabella had "the hand so light that we cannot play well [the clavichord], when we have to strain it for the hardness of the keys". However, they were united by the desire to excel in everything.

In the last two hundred years historians and writers were divided in preference for one or the other: many - such as Francesco Malaguzzi Valeri and Maria Bellonci - regretted that Ludovico had not, only briefly, married Isabella, fantasizing about the splendors that Isabella would be able to bring to Milan, in conditions of greater well-being than to Mantua, and how he could distract the Moro from his perverse policy. These judgments were not separated from a blatant contempt for the second daughter, as in the case of Alessandro Luzio, who writes: "The luck that made play of this Sforza, making him pass from the brightest heights to the darkest abysses of misery, had in April 1480 exchanged a beneficial star for a sinister meteor". 

In truth, other historians, including Rodolfo Renier himself, Luzio's colleague, judged that Beatrice was the most suitable wife for Ludovico, since she knew, with her own audacity, to instill courage in her insecure consort, and acquired political depth already in her early youth, so much so as to be decisive in situations of greatest danger, while Isabella could boast a role in this sense only in the years of maturity. The different fate of the two sisters certainly weighed in these judgments: Isabella lived sixty-five years, Beatrice died at twenty-one. It was from this tragic loss, for which she proved inconsolable, that Isabella undertook to support her brother-in-law's cause with her husband Francesco, who was against him. So he continued to do until the fall of the Sforza, in 1499, when he suddenly changed sides and declared himself to be "good French".

A difficult marriage 
As the couple had known and admired one another for many years, their mutual attraction deepened into love. Reportedly, marriage to Francesco caused Isabella to "bloom". At the time of her wedding, Isabella was said to have been pretty, slim, graceful, and well-dressed.  Her long, fine hair was dyed a fashionable pale blonde and her eyes were described as "brown as fir cones in autumn, scattered laughter". 

The relationship with her husband over the years often proved to be tense, at times very tense, both for the political differences between the two and for the difficulty in procreating a male heir. In truth, Francesco for his part was always very proud of his daughters and never showed himself disappointed, indeed from the beginning he declared himself in love with the firstborn Eleonora, born in 1493, despite the absolute disappointment of Isabella who refused her daughter, who was then very lovingly educated by her sister-in-law Elisabetta, who because of her husband's impotence never had children. When in 1496 the second daughter Margherita was born, Isabella was so angry that she wrote to her husband, who was then fighting the French in Calabria, a letter in which she blamed him, declaring that she did nothing but reap the fruits of his sown. Francis replied that he was instead very happy with the birth of his daughter – who, however, did not have time to know, having died in swaddling clothes – and indeed forbade anyone to show discontent with it.

Only in 1500 was finally born the long-awaited son Federico, who was the most loved by Isabella. 

In his capacity of captain general of the Venetian armies, Francesco often was required to go to Venice for conferences that left Isabella in Mantua on her own at La Reggia, the ancient palace that was the family seat of the Gonzagas. She did not lack company, however, as she passed the time with her mother and with her sister, Beatrice. Upon meeting Elisabetta Gonzaga, her 18-year-old sister-in-law, the two women became close friends. They enjoyed reading books, playing cards, and travelling about the countryside together. Once they journeyed as far as Lake Garda during one of Francesco's absences,  and later travelled to Venice. They maintained a steady correspondence until Elisabetta's death in 1526.

Almost four years after her marriage in December 1493, Isabella gave birth to her first child out of an eventual total of eight. She was a daughter, Eleonora, whom they called Leonora for short, after Isabella's mother, Eleonora of Naples.

Diplomatic missions 
Isabella had met the French king in Milan in 1500 on a successful diplomatic mission that she had undertaken to protect Mantua from French invasion. Louis had been impressed by her alluring personality and keen intelligence.  It was while she was being entertained by Louis, whose troops occupied Milan, that she offered asylum to Milanese refugees including Cecilia Gallerani, the refined mistress of her sister Beatrice's husband, Ludovico Sforza, Duke of Milan, who had been forced to leave his duchy in the wake of French occupation. Isabella presented Cecilia to King Louis, describing her as a "lady of rare gifts and charm".

Lucrezia Borgia 
A year after her 1502 marriage to Isabella's brother Alfonso, the notorious Lucrezia Borgia became the mistress of Francesco. At about the same time, Isabella had given birth to a daughter, Ippolita, and she continued to bear him children throughout Francesco and Lucrezia's long, passionate affair, which was more sexual than romantic. Lucrezia had previously made overtures of friendship to Isabella which the latter had coldly and disdainfully ignored. From the time Lucrezia had first arrived in Ferrara as Alfonso's intended bride, Isabella, despite having acted as hostess during the wedding festivities, had regarded Lucrezia as a rival, whom she sought to outdo at every opportunity.  Francesco's affair with Lucrezia, whose beauty was renowned, caused Isabella much jealous suffering and emotional pain. The liaison ended when he contracted syphilis as a result of encounters with prostitutes.

Regency 

Isabella played an important role in Mantua during troubled times for the city. When her husband was captured in 1509 and held hostage in Venice, she took control of Mantua's military forces and held off the invaders until his release in 1512. In the same year, 1512, she was the hostess at the Congress of Mantua, which was held to settle questions concerning Florence and Milan.  As a ruler, she appeared to have been much more assertive and competent than her husband. When apprised of this fact upon his return, Francesco was furious and humiliated at being surpassed by his wife's superior political ability. This caused their marriage to break down irrevocably. As a result, Isabella began to travel freely and live independently from her husband until his death on 19 March 1519.

After the death of her husband, Isabella ruled Mantua as regent for her son Federico. She began to play an increasingly important role in Italian politics, steadily advancing Mantua's position. She was instrumental in promoting Mantua to a Duchy, which was obtained by wise diplomatic use of her son's marriage contracts. She also succeeded in obtaining a cardinalate for her son Ercole. She further displayed shrewd political acumen in her negotiations with Cesare Borgia, who had dispossessed Guidobaldo da Montefeltro, duke of Urbino, the husband of her sister-in-law and good friend Elisabetta Gonzaga in 1502.

Widowhood

"Devoted head of state" 
As a widow, Isabella at the age of 45 became a "devoted head of state".  Her position as a Marquise required her serious attention, therefore she was required to study the problems faced by a ruler of a city-state. To improve the well-being of her subjects she studied architecture, agriculture, and industry, and followed the principles that Niccolò Machiavelli had set forth for rulers in his book The Prince. In return, the people of Mantua respected and loved her. 

Isabella left Mantua for Rome in 1527. She was present during the catastrophic Sack of Rome, when she converted her house the Palazzo Colonna, into an asylum for approximately 2,000 people (including clerics, nobles and common citizens) fleeing the Imperial soldiers. Her huge place was the only place safe from attacks, because her son Ferrante Gonzaga was a general in the invading army and she herself had good relationship with the emperor. When she left Rome, she managed to acquire safe passage for all the refugees who had sought refuge in her home.

Later years and death 
Once Rome became stabilized following the sacking, she left the city and returned to Mantua. She made it a centre of culture, started a school for girls, and turned her ducal apartments into a museum containing the finest art treasures. This was not enough to satisfy Isabella, already in her mid-sixties, so she returned to political life and ruled Solarolo, in Romagna until her death on 13 February 1539. She was buried beside her husband in the Church of Santa Paola in Mantua, but the remains were stolen.

Appearance and personality 
She has been described as physically attractive, though plump; she possessed "lively eyes" and was "of lively grace". The physical appearance of Isabella interested the king of France Charles VIII, an unrepentant womanizer, who having already met her sister Beatrice, whom he had greatly liked, wanted to know if Isabella resembled her, and asked the chaplain Bernardino of Urbino if she was more beautiful, taller, her age, her features, her character and her virtues.

The chaplain replied that Isabella surpassed her sister in beauty and that she was no taller than her, which greatly pleased King Charles who, being just as short, did not want women taller than him. Jacopo d'Atri communicates to the marquise his suspicion that the king would have come to Mantua to kiss her "a thousand times" as well as he had kissed Beatrice, according to French custom, and reassures her in this regard by telling her that "it is not as deformed as ours describe it"- in fact, Carlo was described by the Italians as very ugly – however the meeting never took place, since shortly after he returned to France. The Mantuan courtiers therefore judged that Isabella was more beautiful than Beatrice, but the lack of her portraits does not allow a sure comparison between the two, which distinguishes the truth from her praise.

After all, Isabella was very concerned with her appearance, as can be understood from many small details. In 1499, having to send her own portrait to Isabella of Aragon, she sent it before her to her brother-in-law Ludovico Sforza, specifying however that her painting did not resemble her very much "for being a little fatter than me". Ludovico replied that he liked the portrait very much of her and that it was very similar to her, although "somewhat more fat", unless Isabella had "grown fatter after we saw her."

With age, her figure underwent an inexorable decline: Pietro Aretino, in his own work, defines her as "monstrous Marquise of Mantua, which has ebony teeth, ivory eyelashes, dishonestly ugly and archdisonestically embellished".

Legacy 
During her lifetime and after her death, poets, popes, and statesmen paid tribute to Isabella. Pope Leo X invited her to treat him with "as much friendliness as you would your brother".   The latter's secretary Pietro Bembo described her as "one of the wisest and most fortunate of women". The poet Ariosto deemed her the "liberal and magnanimous Isabella". Author Matteo Bandello wrote that she was "supreme among women", and the diplomat Niccolò da Correggio entitled her "The First Lady of the world". 

Judgments less imbued with praise, indeed very harsh, were instead expressed by Pope Julius II, a man of corrupt morals, in disagreement with Isabella's conduct, even went so far as to call her "that ribald whore".  A not dissimilar judgment had also expressed her husband Francesco himself who, now a prisoner of the Venetians, accused his wife of not loving him and of having indeed been the cause of his ruin, referring to her by letter as "that whore of my wife".

Cultural pursuits 
Isabella d'Este is famous as the most important art patron of the Renaissance; her life is documented by her correspondence, which remains archived in Mantua (approximately 28,000 letters received and copies of approximately 12,000 letters written).

Art patronage 
In painting she had numerous famous artists of the time work for her, including Giovanni Bellini, Giorgione, Leonardo da Vinci, Andrea Mantegna (court painter until 1506), Perugino, Raphael, Titian, Antonio da Correggio, Lorenzo Costa (court painter from 1509), Dosso Dossi, Francesco Francia, Giulio Romano, and many others. For instance her 'Studiolo' in the Ducal Palace, Mantua, was decorated with allegories by Mantegna, Perugino, Costa, and Correggio. It is suggested that she requested a specific painting for her studio from da Vinci that is known as La Scapigliata and may have given it to her son Federico II on the occasion of his wedding to Margaret Paleologa.

In parallel she contracted the most important sculptors and medallists of her time, i.e. Michelangelo, Pier Jacopo Alari Bonacolsi (L'Antico), Gian Cristoforo Romano, and Tullio Lombardo. She also collected ancient Roman art.

For what concerns writers, she was in contact with Pietro Aretino, Ludovico Ariosto, Pietro Bembo, Baldassare Castiglione, Mario Equicola, Gian Giorgio Trissino, and others.

In music Isabella sponsored the composers Bartolomeo Tromboncino and Marco Cara and she played the lute. Unusually, she employed women as professional singers at her court, including Giovanna Moreschi, the wife of Marchetto Cara.

In the architecture field, she could not afford new palaces, however she commissioned architects such as Biagio Rossetti and Battista Covo.

She was also considered an icon of her time in fashion. Famous is her Balzo as headwear – documented as her invention in letters circa 1509 and visible several times in portraits of other ladies in the 1520s/30s.

Portraits 

Despite her significant art patronage that included a number of portraits, there are very few surviving portraits that may be identified as Isabella, especially when compared to her sister Beatrice.  It is known that the elderly Isabella preferred idealized paintings and even waived sitting as a model. However, it may be presumed that she insisted nonetheless on seeing her personal characteristics in the outcome. These few identifications are known as inhomogeneous (i.e. differing eye and hair colours as well as divergent eyebrows in two Titian portraits) and there are no known images of her between the ages of 26 and 54.  

In 1495 she refused with absolute rigor to pose for Mantegna in the Madonna della Vittoria – where her figure was provided next to that of her husband – since in the past the painter had portrayed her "so badly done" – in a painting that in fact has not survived – "which has none of my similarities". However, the negative judgment of the Marquise was not due to Mantegna's inability to portray her similar to the truth, as she herself writes, but to the opposite lack: of not knowing how to "well counterfeit the natural", that is idealize. Her husband Francesco had to pose alone and Mantegna remedied the disturbance of the symmetry by painting, in place of the Marquise, St. Elizabeth, his eponymous saint.

In recent years several museums have withdrawn their few identifications of portraits as Isabella because of concern about possible misidentification.

The remaining three colourful portraits are still inhomogeneous (Kunsthistorisches Museum/KHM, Vienna):
 Ambras Miniature, 16th century
 Isabella in Red by Titian, c. 1529 (lost, known from a copy by Peter Paul Rubens c. 1605)
 Isabella in Black by Titian, 1536

La Bella (now in Palazzo Pitti, Florence) has been discussed as an alternative to Titian's 1536 portrait in Vienna, because the commission from the 60-year-old patron was for a rejuvenated portrait; if La Bella were Isabella, eye colour, hair colour, eyebrows, and general appearance would homogenize in all known portraits, allowing potential links toward further identifications.

As of 2021, the 1495 medal by Gian Cristoforo Romano (several extant copies) is the only reliable identification because of the inscription created during Isabella's lifetime.

Idealised portraits still show characteristics of the person. The following characteristics can be derived (characteristics of the disputed Isabella in Black are excluded): 
 From her medal (Giovanni Cristoforo Romano) wavy hair, preferred hairstyle with sidelocks and a (small) double chin.
 From the coloured depictions Ambras Miniature and Isabella in Red red-brown / 'medium-blond' hair and brown eyes under curved eyebrows. 
 Isabella preferred idealisation (ideal of beauty, rejuvenation, simplification etc.). 
 Additionally: The balzo was common in the 1530s, probably not yet in the 1510s.

Relationship with Leonardo and Mona Lisa theory 

In the current catalogue raisonné of Leonardo da Vinci (2019), only Isabella d'Este is documented as a plausible alternative as the subject  of Leonardo's Mona Lisa, usually considered a portrait of Lisa del Giocondo. Lisa was the wife of a merchant in Florence and Giorgio Vasari wrote of her portrait by Leonardo, – in debate that persists about whether this is the portrait now known as the Mona Lisa. Evidence in favor of Isabella as the subject of the famous work includes Leonardo's drawing 'Isabella d'Este' from 1499 and her letters of 1501–1506 requesting the promised painted portrait. Further arguments focus upon the mountains in the background indicating the native origin of the subject, and the armrest in the painting as a Renaissance symbol used to identify a portrait as that of a sovereign. The Louvre's reservation is that Isabella would be a "blonde", a feature that exists only in the widely circulated but uncertain representation Isabella in Black.

Children 
Together Isabella and Francesco had eight children:
 Eleonora Gonzaga (31 December 1493 – 13 February 1570), married Francesco Maria I della Rovere, Duke of Urbino, by whom she had issue
 Margherita Gonzaga (13 July 1496 – 22 September 1496)
 Federico II Gonzaga, Duke of Mantua (17 May 1500 – 28 August 1540), married Margaret Paleologa, by whom he had issue
 Livia Gonzaga (1501 – January 1508)
 Ippolita Gonzaga (13 November 1503 – 16 March 1570), who became a nun
 Ercole Gonzaga (23 November 1505 – 2 March 1563), Cardinal, Bishop of Mantua
 Ferrante Gonzaga (28 January 1507 – 15 November 1557), a condottiero; married Isabella di Capua, by whom he had issue
 Livia Gonzaga (August 1508 – 1569), who became a nun

Household slaves 
Correspondence exchanged by Isabella documents the Renaissance European tendency to perceive black African slaves as exotic. Isabella's pursuit of a black child as a servant is extensively documented. On 1 May 1491 Isabella asked Giorgio Brognolo, her agent in Venice, to procure a young black girl ('una moreta') between the ages of one-and-a-half and four, and twice in early June reminded him of the request, emphasizing that the girl should be 'as black as possible'. Isabella's household and financial records reflect that she already had a significantly older black girl in her service when she inquired after a younger black child. Records also reflect that she obtained a little black girl from a Venetian orphanage. She opened negotiations with a Venetian patrician household for the sale of a little black boy and purchased an enslaved little black girl from her sister.

Depiction in modern media 
The artwork The Dinner Party by Judy Chicago features a place setting for Isabella d'Este.

Isabella d'Este was portrayed by Belgian actress Alexandra Oppo in the television show Borgia (2011–2014).

References

Bibliography

Further reading 
 George, L., The Public Perception of Isabella d'Este, Clio History Journal, 2009.
 I camerini di Isabella d'Este Mantua tourist guide.

1474 births
1539 deaths
Isabella
Isabella
16th-century women rulers
Regents of Mantua
16th-century Italian nobility
16th-century Italian women
Italian Renaissance people
Italian art patrons
Italian salon-holders
Renaissance women
Italian letter writers
Women letter writers
Daughters of monarchs